State Route 82 (SR 82) is a state highway in the U.S. state of California that runs from Interstate 880 (I-880) in San Jose to I-280 in San Francisco following the San Francisco Peninsula. It is the spinal arterial road of the peninsula and runs parallel to the nearby Caltrain line along much of the route. For much of its length, the highway is named El Camino Real and formed part of the historic El Camino Real mission trail. It passes through and near the historic downtowns of many Peninsula cities, including Burlingame, San Mateo, Redwood City, Menlo Park, Palo Alto, Mountain View, and Sunnyvale, and through some of the most walkable and transit-oriented neighborhoods in the region.

Route description

At its south end SR 82 starts as The Alameda at I-880 in San Jose. Once it enters Santa Clara, it bends north-east around Santa Clara University and onto El Camino Real, where it continues for the remainder of its trip up the San Francisco Peninsula, paralleling the Caltrain corridor. SR 82, generally called "El Camino" by local residents, runs through a number of cities on the Peninsula, including Palo Alto (passing by Stanford University), San Carlos, San Mateo, Burlingame, and Millbrae, and it is a central artery of the Peninsula communities through which it passes.

In Daly City, SR 82 becomes Mission Street, connecting with San Francisco's Mission Street, but then quickly flows onto San Jose Avenue, crossing Alemany Boulevard, and terminating at I-280.

SR 82 takes an inland course paralleling US 101. The entire route is at street level with at least four lanes of traffic; no portions of it exist as a freeway, although the route is occasionally a divided highway. The Bayshore Freeway and I-280 tend to provide faster alternatives than Route 82 even during traffic jams on those freeways.

From 1964 to 1968, SR 82 continued past its current end north on Alemany Boulevard to Bayshore Boulevard in San Francisco (see below).

Prior to 2013, SR 82 continued past its current south end on The Alameda, becoming Santa Clara St. in Downtown San Jose then turning south on Montgomery St. (southbound) / Autumn St. (northbound); then it turned east on San Carlos St. It turned south on Market St., which becomes 1st St. and then Monterey Highway. It followed Monterey Highway until it turned east briefly on Blossom Hill Road, where it ended at US 101. This relinquished segment south of I-880 within San Jose is legally no longer a state highway,  but the state's Streets and Highways Code mandates that the City of San Jose is still required to maintain "signs directing motorists to the continuation of Route 82" and "ensure the continuity of traffic flow" on this segment. Signs along US 101, I-280, and SR 87 where these relinquished segments intersect still have SR 82 shields. Though as of 2017, certain signs with SR 82 shields have been removed along US 101 near Blossom Hill Road and Capitol Expressway.

SR 82 is part of the National Highway System, a network of highways that are considered essential to the country's economy, defense, and mobility by the Federal Highway Administration.

History

Originally a segment of US 101 (and before that, the historic El Camino Real), the highway became completely inadequate for the needs of traffic with the rapid growth of the San Francisco Bay Area after World War II, including urbanization of the towns along its path. The Bayshore Highway to the east was originally built as "Bypass (BYP) US 101" and was upgraded to a freeway in 1937. With this upgrade, the original US 101 route was transferred to the Bayshore Freeway, and El Camino Real became US 101 BYP, but in response to protests, the switch in designations was reversed two years later, in 1939, and the Bayshore Freeway remained US 101 BYP until 1964.

In 1964, US 101 was moved again onto the Bayshore Freeway, and its former alignment on El Camino Real became SR 82. It was defined as two portions: From Route (US) 101 near Ford Road south of San Jose to Route (US) 101 in San Francisco (which today corresponds to the Alemany Maze), and from Route (US) 101 near Alemany Boulevard to Route (SR) 87 (current unconstructed SR 230) in San Francisco. In 1968, the portions from I-280 (at current SR 82) to US 101 and from SR 101 to SR 87 were transferred to I-280. SR 87 was then deleted north of SR 237 in 1980, and is only constructed south of US 101, and SR 82 today is designated as part of El Camino Real.

In 2013, SR 82 was relinquished south of I-880 through San Jose. However, the state's Streets and Highways Code states that the City of San Jose is still required to "ensure the continuity of traffic flow on the relinquished former portion of Route 82" along The Alameda into downtown San Jose, and from there along Monterey Road to its former terminus at Blossom Hill Road and US 101. The city also has the further option to apply to make this segment a business route.

Grand Boulevard Initiative
The Grand Boulevard Initiative is a partnership of nineteen Bay Area transit agencies and municipalities that operate or manage various portions of the route. Although El Camino Real is ultimately under the stewardship of Caltrans, the organization nevertheless sponsors aesthetic and infrastructural improvements along the corridor and its neighboring parcels in order to revitalize the streetscape and promote density and more walkable and transit-oriented development.

Major intersections

See also

El Camino Real (California)
U.S. Route 101

References

External links

Caltrans: Route 82 highway conditions
California Highways: Route 82
California @ AARoads.com - State Route 82

082
State Route 082
State Route 082
State Route 082
California State Route 082
Transportation in Sunnyvale, California